Miss International 1967, the 7th Miss International pageant, was held on April 29, 1967 at the Long Beach Municipal Auditorium, Long Beach, California, United States. 46 contestants competed for the pageant. Finally, Mirta Massa from Argentina was crowned as Miss International 1967 by outgoing titleholder, Ingrid Finger from Germany.

1966 Cancellation
When Ingrid Finger was crowned as Miss International 1965, the city of Long Beach had decided to discontinue the pageant permanently, due to its competition Miss Universe being popular in the country (before it was staged in this city from 1952-1959, before moving to Miami Beach, Florida in 1960). However, the pageant organizers decided to continue the pageant due to increase in tourism and marking Finger the longest Miss International titleholder for 1 year and 8 months. The city of Long Beach would host the Miss International pageant once more in 1971.

Results

Placements

Contestants

  - Mirta Teresita Massa
  - Margaret Rohan
  - Angelika Aichberger
  - Eliane Lambrechts
  - Maria Cristina Ibáñez Brown
  - Virginia Barbosa de Souza
  - Marjorie Anne Schofield
  - Pearl Nazaria Cooray
  - Marta Lucia Guzmán Perdomo
  - Susan Kristensen
  - Vivien Susana Estrella Cevallos
  - Laura "Laurita" Elena Baquero Palacios
  - Sonia Gail Ross
  - Terttu Helena Ronkanen
  - Martine Grateau
  - Renate Schmale
  - Nagia Galakouti
  - Margaret Frances Glover
  - Sandrina Van Senus
  - Gisella Ma Ka-Wai
  - Kolbrun Einarsdóttir
  - Sonya Mullan
  - Yaffa Sharir
  - Gilda Giuffrida
  - Hiroko Sasaki
  - Jin Hyun-soo
  - Danielle Wagner
  - Marjorie Rongsank
  - Rebeca Morraza Caldera
  - Kaye Evon Forster
  - Milagros Argüello
  - Martha Quimper Suárez
  - Margarita "Marite" Lebumfacil Romualdez
  - Maria Felisa Seda
  - Marlene McFadyn
  - Angela Attias
  - Dawn Duff-Gray
  - Amparo Ruiz
  - Gunilla Ebba Margret Sundberg
  - Ursula "Uschy" Isler
  - Sonia Agnieray
  - Raquel Erlich
  - Pamela Elfast
  - Cecilia Picón-Febres
  - Dawn Sullivan
  - Slavenka Veselinovic

External links
Pageantopolis - Miss International 1967

1967
20th century in Los Angeles County, California
1967 beauty pageants
Beauty pageants in the United States